Diacylglycerol kinase zeta is an enzyme that in humans is encoded by the DGKZ gene.

The protein encoded by this gene belongs to the eukaryotic diacylglycerol kinase family. It may attenuate protein kinase C activity by regulating diacylglycerol levels in intracellular signaling cascade and signal transduction. Alternative splicing occurs at this locus and three transcript variants encoding three distinct isoforms have been identified.

Interactions
DGKZ has been shown to interact with P110α.

References

Further reading